Enjoy! is the debut album by German pop singer Jeanette Biedermann. It was released by Universal Records on 13 November 2000 in German-speaking Europe where it reached the top forty of the German Albums Chart.

Track listing
All Tracks produced by Cobra.

Charts

References

External links
Official website

2000 debut albums
Jeanette Biedermann albums